Saint Genesius  may refer to:
Genesius of Arles, martyred under Maximianus in 303 or 308
Genesius, Bishop of Clermont (died circa 662), French saint and bishop
Genesius, Count of Clermont (died 725), noble of Gaul and reputed miracle worker
Genesius of Lyon (died 679), 37th Archbishop of Lyon
Genesius of Rome, comedian and patron saint of actors
Ginés de la Jara, aka Genesius Sciarensis